Sylvia is a feminine given name of Latin origin, also spelled Silvia. The French form is Sylvie.  The name originates from the Latin word for forest Silva and its meaning is spirit of the wood . The mythological god of the forest was associated with the figure of Silvanus.

William Shakespeare imported 'Silvia' to England. Silvia is the protagonist in the Shakespearean poem: Who is Silvia? what is she, That all our swains commend her? Today, Silvia is the more modern spelling of the name Sylvia. In Roman mythology, Silvia is the goddess of the forest while Rea Silvia was the mother of Romulus and Remus.  Silvia is also the name of one of the female innamorati of the commedia dell'arte and is a character of the Aminta written by Torquato Tasso.  Sylvia (that spelling) was the 137th most popular girl's name in Britain in 1900.

People
 Saint Silvia
 Sylvia (singer), American country singer born Sylvia Jane Kirby
 Sylvia Anderson, British voice artist and film producer
 Sylvia Rose Ashby, Australian market-researcher
 Sylvia Ashton-Warner, New Zealand writer, poet and educator
 Sylvia Browne, American psychic
 Silvia Cartwright, Governor-General of New Zealand
 Sylvia Chang, Taiwanese actress, producer and director
 Sylvia Chase (1938–2019), American broadcast journalist
 Sylvia Constantinidis, Venezuelan-American pianist, conductor and composer
 Sylvia Crawley, American basketball player
 Sylvia Day, American romance writer
 Sylvia Earle, American oceanographer and aquanaut
 Sylvia Martínez Elizondo (1947–2020), Mexican politician
 Sylvia Esterby, Canadian statistician
 Sylvia Fernando (1904–1983), Sri Lankan educator and family planning advocate
 Sylvia Gray (1909–1991), English businessperson
 Sylwia Gruchała, Polish fencer
 Sylvia Hanika, German tennis player
 Sylvia Laughter (1950s-2022), American politician
 Sylvia Likens (1949–1965), American female murder victim
 Sylvia McNair, American singer
 Sylvia Molloy (writer) (1938–2022), Argentine academic and writer
 Silvia Monfort, French actress
 Sylvia Namutebi, Uganda beauty pageant titleholder
 Sylvia Pankhurst, British suffragette and Marxist
 Sylvia Pedlar, American lingerie designer
 Silvia Pinal, Mexican actress
 Sylvia Plath, American confessional poet
 Sylvia Poggioli, Radio news anchor
 Sylvia Ratonel (born 1988), Singaporean singer and spokesmodel
 Sylvia Rivera, American transgender activist
 Sylvia Robinson, American rhythm & blues singer, member of Mickey & Sylvia, and record label executive
 Sylvia Ruuska, American medley and freestyle swimmer
 Sylvia Sanchez, (born 1971), Filipino actress
 Sylvia Schofield (1916–2006), British writer and traveller
 Sylvia Siddell (1941–2011), New Zealand artist
 Sylvia Sidney, American actress
 Sylvia Sleigh, Welsh-American painter 
 Sylvia Syms (1934–2023), English actress
 Sylvia Thalberg, American screenwriter 
 Sylvia Tyson, Canadian musician, performer, singer-songwriter and broadcaster
 Sylvie Vartan, Bulgarian-French singer and actress
 Silvia Vasquez-Lavado, Peruvian-American explorer, mountaineer, social entrepreneur and technologist
 Silvia Rodríguez Villamil (1939–2003), Uruguayan historian, feminist, writer, activist
 Sylvia Vrethammar, Swedish singer
 Sylvia Wene, American ten-pin bowler
 Sylvia Weve, Dutch illustrator
 Queen Silvia of Sweden

Fictional characters 
 Sylvia, the character played by Anita Ekberg in the Italian film La Dolce Vita (1960)
 Sylvia, the character voiced by Kristen Johnston in the American animated film Ice Age (2002)
 Sylvia, character in the animated series Wander Over Yonder
 Sylvia, the protagonist in the short story A White Heron by Sarah Orne Jewett
 Sylvia Costas, Assistant District Attorney in the American television drama NYPD Blue
 Sylvia Fine, the character played by Renee Taylor in the television series The Nanny
 Sylvia Goodwin, the mother of Roy Cropper in the ITV soap opera Coronation Street
 Sylvia Hollamby Character in the ITV prison drama Bad Girls (TV series) played by Helen Fraser
 Sylvia Lyyneheym, a character in the light novel and anime of The Asterisk War
 Sylvia Noble, a character from British science fiction TV series Doctor Who
 Sylvia Rosen, a neighbor who is friendly with Don and Megan Draper in Mad Men (season 6)

See also
 Sylvia (disambiguation)
 Sylvia, a genus term for birds
 Love
 Hong (surname)

References

Given names derived from plants or flowers
Swiss feminine given names
Italian feminine given names
English feminine given names

it:Silvia